Francis Wathier (born December 7, 1984) is a Canadian former professional ice hockey left winger.

Wathier was originally drafted by the Dallas Stars and played for their farm team the Texas Stars. He has had three stints with the Dallas Stars, playing in two games in October 2009, three games in February 2010, and one game in the 2011–12 season. In 2011, he was named an AHL All-Star and scored two goals for the Western Conference in an 11–8 loss to the Eastern Conference. On March 9, 2014, Wathier was traded to the Milwaukee Admirals. On October 21, 2014, Wathier was signed to a professional try-out by the Portland Pirates.

Career statistics

References

External links

1984 births
Franco-Ontarian people
Canadian ice hockey left wingers
Dallas Stars draft picks
Dallas Stars players
Gatineau Olympiques players
Hull Olympiques players
Ice hockey people from Ontario
Idaho Steelheads (ECHL) players
Iowa Stars players
Living people
Milwaukee Admirals players
Portland Pirates players
Texas Stars players
People from the United Counties of Prescott and Russell